Park City may refer to: a city in Utah.

Places
 National Park City, London, England, UK; see parks and open spaces in London

in the United States
 Park City, Illinois
 Park City, Kansas
 Park City, Kentucky
 Park City, Montana
 Park City, Tennessee
 Park City, Utah
Park City Historic District, a residential historic district in Amasa, Michigan

Facilities and structures
 Park City Center (Sofia), Bulgaria; a shopping centre

in the United States
 Park City Plaza, Bridgeport, Connecticut, USA; an office building
 Park City Center, Lancaster, Pennsylvania, USA; a shopping center
 Park City Hospital, Utah, USA; see List of hospitals in Utah
 Park City Branch, Salt Lake City, Utah, USA; a rail division
 Park City Mountain Resort, Park City, Utah, USA; a ski resort
 Park City High School, Park City, Utah, USA

Other uses
 MV Park City, a ferry
 Park City (short story collection) by Ann Beattie
 Park City Daily News, Bowling Green, Kentucky, USA; a newspaper
 Park City Television, a cable channel based in Utah, USA
 Park City Film Music Festival, Park City, Utah, USA
 MS Park City, a Microsoft software package developed at Lehi, Utah
 Park City Group, a software company based in Salt Lake City, Utah, USA

See also

 city park, urban parks
 New Park City Arena, Park City, Kentucky, USA; a multipurpose arena
 Park Cities, Texas, USA;
 Salt Lake and Park City Railway, a former railway in Utah
 Siam Park City, Bangkok, Thailand; an amusement park waterpark
 
 City Park (disambiguation)
 Park (disambiguation)
 City (disambiguation)